The San Miguel Beermen was a professional basketball team that played in the ASEAN Basketball League (ABL) from 2012 to 2013. The team was from the Philippines and owned by San Miguel Corporation (SMC). This franchise was separate and distinct from the original Philippine Basketball Association (PBA) franchise which played as the "Petron Blaze Boosters" when this team was active. The Beermen played most of their home games at the Ynares Sports Arena in Pasig but also played some of their games in the Olivarez College Gym, Ynares Center, and PhilSports Arena.

History

In July 2011, SMC announced its participation in the ASEAN Basketball League (ABL) beginning in the 2012 ABL season, as the San Miguel Beermen - a franchise distinct from its PBA franchise.

In June 2013, the Beermen won its first ABL title in the 2013 ABL Playoffs, defeating the Indonesia Warriors. The team disbanded shortly after without any formal announcement.

On January 31, 2018, SMC returned to the ABL as name sponsor of Alab Pilipinas.

Final roster

Coaches
 Bobby Parks (2012)
 Leo Austria (2013)

Notable players

Junjun Cabatu
Leo Avenido
Chris Banchero
June Mar Fajardo
Asi Taulava
Eric Menk
John Ferriols
Christian Luanzon
Kelvin dela Peña
 Brian Williams
 Gabe Freeman
Froilan Baguion
 Matt Rogers
Jeric Fortuna
 Justin Williams
 Richard Jeter
 Jarrid Famous
 Duke Crews
 Nick Fazekas
Roger Yap
Benedict Fernandez
Val Acuna
Axel Doruelo
Michael Burtscher
R.J. Rizada
JR Cawaling
Paolo Hubalde

Retired numbers
The retired numbers of the San Miguel Beermen hanging in the rafters of the Ynares Sports Arena belong to those who played for the original San Miguel Beermen team in the Philippine Basketball Association, not the ABL team.

  – retired during the 2000 PBA season after announcing Caidic's retirement. Jersey number retired together with Barangay Ginebra San Miguel
  – retired during the 2010-11 PBA season
  – retired during the 1995 PBA season

See also
 San Miguel Beermen (PBA team)

References

External links
ASEAN Basketball League
Official website

2011 establishments in the Philippines
ASEAN Basketball League teams
Defunct basketball teams in the Philippines
ABL
San Miguel Corporation
Basketball teams established in 2011
Basketball teams disestablished in 2013
2013 disestablishments in the Philippines